A bank failure occurs when a bank is unable to meet its obligations to its depositors or other creditors because it has become insolvent or too illiquid to meet its liabilities. A bank usually fails economically when the market value of its assets declines to a value that is less than the market value of its liabilities. The insolvent bank either borrows from other solvent banks or sells its assets at a lower price than its market value to generate liquid money to pay its depositors on demand. The inability of the solvent banks to lend liquid money to the insolvent bank creates a bank panic among the depositors as more depositors try to take out cash deposits from the bank. As such, the bank is unable to fulfill the demands of all of its depositors on time. A bank may be taken over by the regulating government agency if its shareholders' equity are below the regulatory minimum.

The failure of a bank is generally considered to be of more importance than the failure of other types of business firms because of the interconnectedness and fragility of banking institutions. Research has shown that the market value of customers of the failed banks is adversely affected at the date of the failure announcements. It is often feared that the spill over effects of a failure of one bank can quickly spread throughout the economy and possibly result in the failure of other banks, whether or not those banks were solvent at the time as the marginal depositors try to take out cash deposits from these banks to avoid from suffering losses. Thereby, the spill over effect of bank panic or systemic risk has a multiplier effect on all banks and financial institutions leading to a greater effect of bank failure in the economy. As a result, banking institutions are typically subjected to rigorous regulation, and bank failures are of major public policy concern in countries across the world.

Notable acquisitions of failed banks

This list does not include partial purchases by governments to prevent bank or banking system failures, such as government intervention during the subprime mortgage crisis.

Bank failures in the U.S.
In the U.S., deposits in savings and checking accounts are backed by the FDIC. Currently, each account owner is insured up to $250,000 in the event of a bank failure. When a bank fails, in addition to insuring the deposits, the FDIC acts as the receiver of the failed bank, taking control of the bank's assets and deciding how to settle its debts. The number of bank failures has been tracked and published by the FDIC since 1934, and has decreased after a peak in 2010 due to the financial crisis of 2007–2008.

No advance notice is given to the public when a bank fails. Under ideal circumstances, a bank failure can occur without customers losing access to their funds at any point. For example, in the 2008 failure of Washington Mutual the FDIC was able to broker a deal in which JP Morgan Chase bought the assets of Washington Mutual for $1.9 billion. Existing customers were immediately turned into JP Morgan Chase customers, without disruption in their ability to use their ATM cards or do banking at branches. Such policies are designed to discourage bank runs that might cause economic damage on a wider scale.

Global failure
The failure of a bank is relevant not only to the country in which it is headquartered, but for all other nations with which it conducts business. This dynamic was highlighted during the financial crisis of 2007–2008, when the failures of major bulge bracket investment banks affected local economies globally. This interconnectedness was manifested not on a high level, with respect to deals negotiated between major companies from different parts of the world, but also to the global nature of any one company's makeup. Outsourcing is a key example of this makeup; as major banks such as Lehman Brothers and Bear Stearns failed, the employees from countries other than the United States suffered in turn. A 2015 analysis by the Bank of England found greater interconnectedness between banks has led to a greater transmission of stresses during a time of recession.

See also

 Bank run
 Causes of the Great Depression
 List of banks acquired or bankrupted in the United States during the financial crisis of 2007–2008
 List of bank failures in the United States (2008–present)
 List of largest U.S. bank failures
 Too Big to Fail
 Volcker Rule
 Zombie bank

References

Further reading
 Calomiris, Charles W., and Joseph R. Mason. "Fundamentals, panics, and bank distress during the depression." American Economic Review (2003): 1615-1647. online
 Carlson, Mark. "Causes of bank suspensions in the panic of 1893." Explorations in Economic History 42.1 (2005): 56-80. online
 Wicker, Elmus. The banking panics of the Great Depression (2000).
 Wicker, Elmus. Banking panics of the gilded age (2006).
 Wicker, Elmus. "A Reconsideration of the Causes of the Banking Panic of 1930." Journal of Economic History 40.03 (1980): 571-583.

External links
 FDIC's list of failed banks since 2000
 TheStreet.com Interactive bank failure map (2009)
The Story of Indian Bank Failure
 BusinessPundit.com lists the top 25 largest bank failures, but it includes non-U.S. banks; it is dated May 7, 2009.

Banking